Gloria Bohan is a founder and CEO of travel management companies. 

Bohan founded Omega World Travel's first travel agency in 1972 in Fredericksburg, Virginia. She opened a second office in 1978 in Washington, D.C. In 1998 Bohan founded Cruise.com, an online travel services company focusing on cruise ship travel. She became Chairman and CEO of TravTech in 2001, a travel technology company developing SaaS software for travel agencies and business travel focused companies. As of 2017, her company Omega World Travel reported annual sales of over $1 billion.

Accolades and recognition
Ms. Bohan has been inducted into the Enterprising Women Hall of Fame, received Office Depot's Business Woman of the Year award and was named one of the 25 most influential leaders in the travel industry by Tour and Travel News.
 2021 - Receives Lifetime Achievement award from Travel Weekly Magazine
 2018 - Honored as Godmother of Riviera Cruises Robert M. Burns ship
 2018 - Receives ASTA’s Lifetime Achievement Award
 2018 - Inducted into BTN Hall of Fame
 2016 - Named Entrepreneur of the Year by Million Women Mentors
 2015 - Honored as Godmother of Windstar Cruises' Star Legend
 2012 - Gold Award in the 2012 Magellan Awards from Travel Weekly Magazine
 2012 - “Top Business” Recipient in five categories by DiversityBusiness.com
 2011 - Named a Washington Business Hall of Fame Laureate
 2011 - Inducted into the Washington Business Hall of Fame at the Hall of Fame dinner and awards ceremony
 2011 - Featured in the November 2011 issue of The Washingtonian
 2010 - Top 100 Minority Business Enterprise Award
 2009 - NDTA Distinguished Service Award” from the National Defense Transportation Association
 2009 - ‘Outstanding Woman Business’ at the National Minority Business Council’s (NMBC) 29th Annual Awards Luncheon held in New York City
 2009 - The Society of Government Travel Professionals (SGTP) recognized Omega with a Professional Development Award for MIS during the ANCON Government Travel Conference
 2005 - Inducted into the Enterprising Women Hall of Fame
 2004 - Named Office Depot's Businesswoman of the Year
 2004 - Named Travel Agent of the Year by The American Society of Travel Agents
 Tour and Travel News' "One of the 25 Most Influential Leaders in the Travel Industry"

References 

Year of birth missing (living people)
Living people
American chief executives of travel and tourism industry companies
Women business executives

External links 
 Omega World Travel
 Cruise.com
 TravTech.com